Plans Within Plans is the twelfth studio album by American punk rock band MxPx, which was released on April 3, 2012. It is their first original album since 2007's Secret Weapon. The album was released on MxPx's own label, Rock City Recording Company, as well as a few others in various countries including Bullion Records in Japan, Flix Records in Europe and the UK, and El Shaddai Records in  Australia and New Zealand. Plans Within Plans was written, recorded, and produced by the band.

Title meaning
Vocalist and bassist Mike Herrera said that the album's title related to the mayhem around  writing new songs, recording them and doing all of the booking and performing concert tours.

Track listing

Personnel
 Mike Herrera — bass, lead vocals
 Tom Wisniewski  — guitar, backing vocals
 Yuri Ruley — drums, percussion

References

2012 albums
MxPx albums